Boris Fishman (born 1979) is an American writer. He is the author of the novels Don’t Let My Baby Do Rodeo (2016) and A Replacement Life (2014), and Savage Feast (2019).

Early life
Fishman was born in Minsk, formerly the capital of the Byelorussian Soviet Socialist Republic, and presently the capital of Belarus to a family of Jewish-Soviet origin.  Fishman immigrated to the U.S. in 1988 with his family. He holds a BA in Russian literature from Princeton University and has written works of non-fiction and literary criticism.

Career
Fishman is the author of the novel A Replacement Life, a 2014 New York Times Notable Book of the Year  and won the VCU Cabell First Novelist Award and the American Library Association's Sophie Brody Medal. The novel tells the story of a young Jewish-Soviet immigrant who assists his grandfather in defrauding the Conference on Jewish Material Claims Against Germany until they are caught. Fishman's second novel, Don't Let My Baby Do Rodeo (2016), tells the story of a New Jersey couple who adopt a difficult baby from Montana. His third book, Savage Feast, has been described as "part memoir, part cookbook" as it mixes stories and recipes together from Fishman's childhood.

Having taught in Princeton University's Creative Writing Program from 2015 to 2020, Boris recently began teaching in the MFA program at the University of Montana in Missoula, Montana, where he lives with his wife and daughter.

References

External links

HarperCollins author page

Living people
1979 births
American male writers
American people of Belarusian-Jewish descent
Princeton University faculty
Princeton University alumni
Jewish American writers
Soviet writers
Soviet emigrants to the United States
21st-century American Jews